St Andrew's Church is a Grade I listed building in Walberswick, Suffolk. It is an active parish church in the Church of England.

History

The church has a fine 15th-century tower.
The building originally comprised a nave and chancel, with an eighteen-bay clerestory and six-bay north and south aisles. 
When the prosperity of the village suffered, there were insufficient funds to maintain the church, and in the 1690s, the parish obtained permission to demolish the old church and build a much smaller one. This was funded by the sale of lead from the roofs and the bells from the tower.

The newer church now sits within the ruins of the old.

Parish status

The Parish of Walberswick is part of the Sole Bay Team Ministry, along with seven other parishes: 
Holy Trinity Church, Blythburgh
St Margaret of Antioch's Church, Reydon
St Andrew's Church, Sotherton 
St Lawrence Church, South Cove
St Edmund's Church, Southwold
St Mary's Church, Uggeshall
St Peter and St Paul's Church, Wangford

Organ

The former organ was transferred to St. Mary the Virgin, Great Bradley around 1959 when the present instrument was installed. 
The organ, which has two manuals, is located in the chancel. Further details are available on the National Pipe Organ Register.

References

Church of England church buildings in Suffolk
Grade I listed churches in Suffolk
St Andrew's Church